"Om sanningen ska fram" (English: "If truth be told") is a song by Swedish musician, songwriter, music producer and DJ Eric Amarillo. The song was released on 6 May 2011 as a Digital download. The song reached number one on the Swedish Singles Chart.

Music video
The music video for the song was uploaded to YouTube on April 27, 2011.

Track listing

Charts and certifications

Charts

Certifications

Release history

References

2011 singles
Number-one singles in Sweden
2011 songs
EMI Records singles